Peabody Pond extends from the southern tip of Bridgton into northern Sebago forming the western boundary of Naples, Maine. The eastern tip of the lake receives drainage from Cold Rain Pond in Naples. The southern tip of the lake overflows as the Northwest River through  of boggy land to the western shore of Sebago Lake at East Sebago. The pond has a native population of rainbow smelt, and has been stocked with smallmouth bass, lake trout, and land-locked Atlantic salmon. A boat-launching area near the outlet of the lake is accessible from Tiger Hill Road off Maine State Route 107.

References

Lakes of Cumberland County, Maine
Bridgton, Maine
Sebago, Maine
Naples, Maine
Reservoirs in Maine